Alex Samuel Fletcher (born 30 April 1999) is an English semi professional footballer who plays for  club Bath City.

Career 
Fletcher, as an academy player, made his first team debut at home in the FA Cup in a 0–0 draw with Newport County, on as a 79th-minute substitute for Craig Tanner.

He signed a professional contract in the summer of 2017, and made his full debut in the EFL Trophy, in a group stage game vs Chelsea U-21s. Fletcher scored two goals in the last 2 minutes as Argyle came from behind to win on penalties.

Fletcher scored his first career league goal in a League One game, a 2–1 defeat to Fleetwood Town.

On 4 January 2018, Fletcher joined Torquay United, who were at the time bottom of the National League, on a 28-day loan. He went on to play just three times for Torquay, who did not take up the option to extend his spell.

On 3 September 2019, Fletcher joined Aldershot Town of the National League, initially on a one-month loan. On 7 December 2019 he joined Southern League club Tiverton Town F.C. on a month's loan deal. The deal was later extended for another 28 days and later to the end of the season. He re-joined Tiverton permanently at the start of the following season.

In January 2021, Fletcher joined Bath City for an undisclosed fee from Tiverton Town.

On 8 November 2022, Fletcher was critically injured when he crashed into advertising hoardings at the side of the pitch at Twerton Park; the fixture was abandoned soon afterwards. He was admitted into intensive care and underwent emergency neurosurgery. On 21 November 2022, Fletcher left intensive care.

Career statistics

References

1999 births
Living people
People from Newton Abbot
Footballers from Devon
Association football forwards
English footballers
Plymouth Argyle F.C. players
Torquay United F.C. players
Aldershot Town F.C. players
Tiverton Town F.C. players
Bath City F.C. players
English Football League players
National League (English football) players
Southern Football League players